Phil Hamer (born 13 August 1990, in Salford) is a former English professional ice hockey player who played for the Manchester Phoenix in the Elite Ice Hockey League.  Hamer was the first player to be promoted through the Phoenix youth system and make an EIHL appearance for the Phoenix.

Hamer had impressed at junior level with the Phoenix, and his opportunity came towards the end of the 2007–08 season, with Phoenix head coach Tony Hand's decision to release Rhys McWilliams from the Phoenix roster.  Hamer stepped into the role with relish and started five regular season games for the Phoenix in the 2007–08 season.  His work rate and effort impressed Hand enough to ensure his permanent promotion to the senior squad for the following 2008–09 term. Following several appearances for the Phoenix, Hamer was dropped although he still plays for the ENL side also named Manchester Phoenix.

Hamer initially chose shirt number 17 but after the signing of veteran defenceman Dwight Parrish in May 2008, he would voluntarily change to become number 76.

Hamer is also an accomplished inline hockey player and he was a FIRS World Champion in 2008 at Under 19 level, whilst playing for Great Britain. He was the tournaments top point scorer and was voted on to the Dream Team. Hamer was also Alternate Captain. He has also represented Great Britain IIHF at 7 world championships where he is ranked 4th highest point scorer all time. 2006-07 saw Hamer move to Spain to play for Valladolid in their primera division, In 2010 he played for Assenheim Patriots in Germany in the Bundesliga where he would return in the future for another season. He played for Villeneuve in the French elite league in the 14/15 season. Hamer is also a 3 time Sparta cup champion which is held just north of Barcelona in the town of Lloret De Mar. He was voted Most Valuable Player in the 2019 tournament.

Career stats

External links

Phil Hamer Personal Profile, Manchester Phoenix Official Website
'Hamer Gets The Phoenix Call', Manchester Phoenix Official Website, 09/05/08
'Hamer Happy To Change Shirt Number', Manchester Phoenix Official Website, 05/06/08

1990 births
English ice hockey forwards
Living people
Manchester Phoenix players